Alexander Yevgenyevich Mishkin is a doctor in the Russian General Staff's Main Directorate (also known as GRU), the military intelligence service of the Russian Federation.

On 8 October 2018, investigative website Bellingcat and its partner The Insider claimed that Mishkin was one of the suspects in the poisoning of Sergei and Yulia Skripal and the killing of Dawn Sturgess, having travelled to the United Kingdom under the alias Alexander Petrov. Another alias he has used is Nicolaj Popa.

Biography 
Mishkin was born on July 13, 1979, in the village of Loyga, Arkhangelsk Oblast, Soviet Union. He studied at the S. M. Kirov Military Medical Academy.

In 2014 he received Hero of Russia award and free upscale apartment in Moscow for his GRU activities.

In April 2021 Mishkin, alongside Anatoliy Chepiga, was linked to the 2014 Vrbětice ammunition warehouses explosions in the Czech Republic. He is wanted by the Czech Police.

References 

Living people
1979 births
Russian colonels
GRU officers
People from Ustyansky District
Russian military doctors
S.M. Kirov Military Medical Academy alumni